Borovichikha is a rural locality (a village) in Verkhovskoye Rural Settlement, Verkhovazhsky District, Vologda Oblast, Russia. The population was 8 as of 2002.

Geography 
Borovichikha is located 38 km southwest of Verkhovazhye (the district's administrative centre) by road. Kiselevo is the nearest rural locality.

References 

Rural localities in Verkhovazhsky District